Tomasz Tłuczyński (born 19 April 1979) is a retired Polish team handball player, who was playing on the Poland men's national handball team. He received a silver medal with the Polish team at the 2007 World Men's Handball Championship. He participated at the 2008 Summer Olympics, where Poland finished 5th. He also received a bronze medal with the Polish team at the 2009 World Men's Handball Championship.

References

External links

1979 births
Living people
Polish male handball players
Olympic handball players of Poland
Handball players at the 2008 Summer Olympics
Sportspeople from Kielce